The Brantley Historic District in Brantley in Crenshaw County, Alabama is a  historic district which was listed on the National Register of Historic Places in 2004.  It then included 112 contributing buildings and 15 non-contributing ones.

The district is roughly bounded by Sasser St., Fulton Ave., Peachtree St. and Wyatt, and the former Central of Georgia railroad line.

The town came into being in 1890 with the surveying of the railroad line.

The district includes commercial buildings, and it also includes residences, including Victorian cottages built along both sides of Main Street by carpenters Buster Wyatt and Bill Harrington.

References

External links

Historic districts on the National Register of Historic Places in Alabama
Queen Anne architecture in Alabama
Buildings and structures completed in 1890
Crenshaw County, Alabama